Thurlestone is a village  west of Kingsbridge in the South Hams district in south Devon, England. There is an electoral ward in the same name. The population at the 2011 census was 1,886.

The village takes its name from Thurlestone Rock, the so-called "thirled stone", an arch-shaped rock formation just offshore in Thurlestone Bay.

The village's All Saints church is built of the dark grey local slate. The chancel is early 13th century; the remainder of the church 15th and 16th century.

Thurlestone Marsh
Thurlestone Marsh is one of three small wetlands south of the village (South Milton Ley and South Huish Marsh are the others). It is formed where a small unnamed stream flows through low-lying flat farmland just inland from Leas Foot Sand, a small beach just to the southwest of the village.

The site consists of a number of reed-fringed pools.

Tourism
Tourism is supported by self-catering houses and a hotel in the village.  About 60% of houses in the village are rented out at some time in the year.

Wildlife
In 2002, a 30-year-old female pygmy sperm whale was washed up on Thurlestone Beach.

2005 saw two significant ornithological events (Devon Bird Report 2005):

 In late March and early April, a flock of 68 garganey was offshore in the bay – the second largest flock ever to be recorded in Britain (the largest was a flock of 120 in Kent in the 1950s).
 In August, a least sandpiper, a North American vagrant shorebird only recorded once in Devon previously, was present on Thurlestone Marsh.

Walks
There is a walk from the main village to Bantham and another walk to Salcombe going through Hope Cove and Bolberry . Both of these are along the headland. There are also a numerous walks to nearby beaches and villages.

References

External links
Images of Thurlestone

Beaches of Devon
Villages in South Hams
Civil parishes in South Hams